Thalie may refer to:

 Thalie (river), a tributary of the Saône in France
 Lynda Thalie, Canadian singer-songwriter
 Thalie Tremblay, Canadian fencer

See also 
 Thali (disambiguation)
 Thalia Awards (Czech: Ceny Thálie), annual acting awards
 Thalia (disambiguation)